Four ships of the United States Navy have been named USS Trenton, after the city of Trenton, New Jersey, site of the Battle of Trenton in the American Revolutionary War.

  was a wooden screw steamer commissioned in 1877 and wrecked at Samoa by a hurricane in 1889.
  was a light cruiser initially in service in 1924, seeing some action during World War II, and decommissioned in 1945.
  was an amphibious transport dock commissioned in 1971. It was sold to the Indian Navy in 2007 and renamed , meaning "river/sea horse".

United States Navy ship names